"Disaster" is a song recorded by British rapper Dave featuring British rapper J Hus, released as the fourth single from Dave's debut studio album Psychodrama. The song was written by Dave, J Hus, Ikeoluwa Oladigbolu (aka TSB), Ayodele Oyadare (aka iO) and produced by iO, TSB, Fraser T. Smith, and Dave.

Commercially, the song reached the top 10 in the United Kingdom and top 40 in Ireland. In January 2022, it was certified as Platinum by the British Phonographic Industry for exceeding chart sales of 600,000.

Charts

Certifications

References

2019 singles
2019 songs
Dave (rapper) songs
J Hus songs
Song recordings produced by Fraser T. Smith
Songs written by Dave (rapper)
Songs written by J Hus